James Lafayette Bomar Jr. (July 1, 1914 – June 25, 2001) was an American lawyer and politician who served in both houses of the Tennessee General Assembly. He served as Speaker of the Tennessee House of Representatives from 1953 to 1963 and as Speaker of the Senate and Lieutenant Governor of Tennessee from 1963 to 1965. From 1979 to 1980, he was the president of Rotary International.

References

External links
James L. Bomar Jr. at the Tennessee Encyclopedia

1914 births
2001 deaths
Lieutenant Governors of Tennessee
People from Bedford County, Tennessee
Speakers of the Tennessee House of Representatives
Democratic Party members of the Tennessee House of Representatives
Democratic Party Tennessee state senators
United States Navy personnel of World War II
20th-century American politicians